Afanasyevo is a rural locality (a village) in Paustovskoye Rural Settlement, Vyaznikovsky District, Vladimir Oblast, Russia. The population was 67 as of 2010.

Geography 
Afanasyevo is located 13 km south of Vyazniki (the district's administrative centre) by road. Vorobyovka is the nearest rural locality.

References 

Rural localities in Vyaznikovsky District